Morgan Victoria Weaver (born October 18, 1997) is an American soccer player who plays as a forward for Portland Thorns FC.

College career
Weaver played college soccer at Washington State from 2016 to 2019. She scored her first collegiate goals on September 4, 2016, recording a hat-trick against North Dakota State. Weaver was named to the All-Pac-12 Freshman Team in 2016. In 2017, she was named to the All-Pac-12 third team. She was named to the All-Pac-12 first team in 2018, and was named to the All-Pac-12 second team in 2019.

Club career
On January 16, 2020, she was selected as the second overall pick in the 2020 NWSL College Draft.

Weaver made her professional debut for Portland Thorns FC on June 27, 2020, in the 2020 NWSL Challenge Cup, coming on as a substitute in the 54th minute for Tyler Lussi against North Carolina Courage. She scored her first professional goal on July 17, 2020 against North Carolina Courage.

International career
Weaver received a call-up to the United States national under-23 team in March 2019.

Weaver received her first call up to the United States national team in November 2021.

Career statistics

International

Honors 
Portland Thorns FC

 NWSL Championship: 2022

References

External links

 Player profile

1997 births
Living people
People from University Place, Washington
Soccer players from Washington (state)
American women's soccer players
United States women's international soccer players
Women's association football forwards
Portland Thorns FC players
National Women's Soccer League players
Portland Thorns FC draft picks
Washington State Cougars women's soccer players